Shirley Abbott may refer to:
Shirley Abbott (ambassador) (1924–2013), American diplomat
Shirley Abbott (author) (1934–2019), American writer and magazine editor 
Shirley Abbott (footballer) (1889–1947), English footballer